Tomás de la Quadra-Salcedo Fernández del Castillo (born 2 January 1946) is a Spanish politician who served as Minister of Territorial Administration from December 1982 to July 1985 and as Minister of Justice from March 1991 to July 1993.

References

1946 births
Living people
Complutense University of Madrid alumni
Government ministers of Spain
20th-century Spanish politicians
Justice ministers of Spain